Acronicta nigricans is a moth of the family Noctuidae. It is found in western China.

References 

Acronicta
Moths of Asia
Moths described in 1900